Marana Mrudangam is a 1988 Indian Telugu-language action crime film, produced by K. S. Rama Rao under the Creative Commercials banner and directed by A. Kodandarami Reddy. It stars Chiranjeevi, Radha, Suhasini and K. Naga Babu , with music composed by  Ilaiyaraaja and is based on Yandamuri Veerendranath's novel of the same name.

Plot
Jaani (Chiranjeevi) runs a small-time casino with his partner Bhillu (Nagendra Babu). One day he helps two women Anusha (Radha) and Uthpala (Suhasini), stuck with their broken car, and gives them a drive. Utpala succeeds in an interview by remembering Jaani's answer and gets a job as a nurse in a hospital. Jaani and his partner also help Anusha to get a job by blocking her competitor.

One day, Bhillu discovers cocaine in an egg in his kitchen and they start investigating the source of this egg. They discover this to be from Pogaku Subbarao (Gollapudi)'s store. This unfolds the links between a seeming businessman, Pogaku Subbarao, and an underworld Don, Vasanth Dada (Suresh Oberoi). They also offer jobs to the unemployed and use them to sell their body parts. Utpala's unemployed brother Sharma (Prasad Babu) gets into their trap and leaves home. Utpala reaches Jaani for help to talk to her brother. Jaani discovers that the phone number given to contact her brother is in the same city and starts exploring into this. Meanwhile, Anusha lodges a complaint against Pogaku Subbarao and his nephew, Sudhakar about their dark secrets.

Salim (Ranjeet), a left hand of Suresh Oberoi, disguises himself as a policeman and asks Anusha to come with him for an inquiry. When he attempts a rape, Jaani saves her. They fall in love and start exploring Vasanth Dada's kingdom. They discover that Sharma escaped from Vasanth Dada's den and left a letter with Utpala, explaining every activity in the underworld.  Sharma, the lone witness of the underworld, is killed in the hospital by Salim. When Jaani and Anusha attack Vasanth Dada, they're captured and left in a desert as prey for vultures. Using a magnifying glass, dropped by Pogaku Subbarao, they free themselves and attack Vasanth Daada.

In the final clash, Jaani and Bhillu collapse the entire Vasanth Dada dynasty. Jaani marries Anusha and is shown traveling with kid.

Cast

Crew
 Story: Yandamuri Veerendranath [based on his novel by the same name]
 Dialogues: Sainath Thotapalli
 Lyrics: Veturi
 Art Director: Thota Tharani
 Dances: Tara
 Stunts: Raju
 Associate Producer: K. Banerjee
 Associate Director: Kethineni Ajay
 Editor: M. Vellai Swamy
 Cinematography: Lok Singh
 Music: Ilaiyaraaja
 Producer: K. S. Rama Rao
 Screenplay & Direction: A. Kodandarami Reddy

Soundtrack
The music for the movie was composed by the maestro Ilaiyaraaja and all lyrics were penned by Veturi.
 "Godave Godavama": S. P. Balasubrahmanyam, K. S. Chithra
 "Jungili Jima": S. P. Balasubrahmanyam, Durga
 "Karigipoyaanu": S. P. Balasubrahmanyam, P. Susheela
 "Kottandi Tittandi": S. P. Balasubrahmanyam, K. S. Chithra
 "Sarigama Padanisa": S. P. Balasubrahmanyam, K. S. Chithra

Box office and trivia
The film was a declared a hit at the box office, but compared to the previous 3 films, Abhilasha, Challenge and Rakshasudu, Marana Mrudangam was an average success from the combination of Chiranjeevi-A. Kodandarami Reddy-K. S. Rama Rao-Ilaiyaraaja-Yandamuri.

The film is based on the celebrated novel by Yandamuri Veerendranath, with the same title. Being a long novel, it had to be trimmed without losing the essence. Veerendranath himself did it in the screenplay, by establishing relationships between the characters. However, many details, to boost the heroism, were added to the screenplay, to ensure the commercial success of the film.

External links
 Marana Mrudangam at IMDb
 "Karigi Poyanu" song lyrics

1980s Telugu-language films
1988 films
Films directed by A. Kodandarami Reddy
Films scored by Ilaiyaraaja
Films based on novels by Yandamuri Veerendranath
Films based on Indian novels
Indian action films
Films about drugs
1988 action films